Valentin Wolfenstein (19 April 1845 – 3 February 1909) was a Swedish-American photographer who worked both in Stockholm and Los Angeles, California. He was one of the first photographers to use flash-lamps for photography.

He owned the first successful photography studio in Los Angeles where he photographed many famous Californians in the 1870s in 1880s.

After returning to Sweden, Wolfenstein owned Atelier Jaeger, the official court photographer's studio in Stockholm, from 1890 to 1905. He was a pioneer in his field and possibly the first in Sweden to make interior pictures in theaters using flash-lamp photography. He took pictures of theater scenes and actors' dressing rooms. A particular skill he developed was taking "look-alike pictures", a double exposure technique that combined images of the same person in two different poses, for example, sitting and standing.

Early life
Wolfenstein was born August Valentin Wolfenstein on 19 April 1845 in Falun. His parents were Viktor Adolf Wolfenstein (1817–1881) and Anna Elisabeth Brostrom (1807–1851). He emigrated to the United States during the American Civil War and enlisted in New York City on 31 January 1865. After the war he worked as a photographer in New Bedford, Massachusetts, where he had a photography studio in 1867.

He established a studio in Los Angeles in 1871 on the second floor of New Temple Block in Downtown Los Angeles. Here he bought the services of Henri Penelon, a French painter, for color tinting portraits. He is also listed as still being at Temple Block in 1875 in the Los Angeles city directory.

Mid-life
Wolfenstein married Philopena Brown (1863–1884) on 26 February 1884 while he was in New Bedford. They had a daughter the same year, named Florentina. Philopena died later that year. He then married Clara Brown (1868–1892). They had two sons, Robert (1889–1977) and Walter (1890 – d. before 1909). When he failed at some Los Angeles side businesses in the 1880s, he sought new surroundings and went to Guatemala and Mexico where he ran photographic studios.

He returned to Sweden in the 1890s, sometime after Clara died, and settled in Stockholm, where he became an employee of the royal photographer Johannes Jaeger at his studio, Atelier Jaeger. In the 1890s, Wolfenstein established a photographic studio at Drottninggatan 33 in Stockholm. When Jaeger moved back to Germany, his home country, Wolfenstein bought both of his studios for 60,000 kronor. Wolfenstein continued to call the studio of 30 employees by its original name "Atelier Jaeger", because of its already established reputation as the official court photographer.

Later life and death
Wolfenstein sold Atelier Jaeger in 1905 and returned to the United States. Albin Roosval and Herman Sylwander, who took over his studios, kept the same original name for the studio.

Wolfenstein died in Los Angeles on 3 February 1909 at the age of 63. He is buried at Angelus-Rosedale Cemetery in Central Los Angeles.

Photography work

Personal pictures

References

Bibliography

External links 

1845 births
1909 deaths
American portrait photographers
Union Army soldiers
Photographers from California
Artists from Los Angeles
Artists from Stockholm
Burials at Angelus-Rosedale Cemetery
People from Falun
Swedish emigrants to the United States
19th century in Los Angeles
19th-century American photographers
19th-century Swedish photographers